History 

Fritz Bühler (1862–1929) [1] and his wife Clara Bühler (1886–1971) [2] opened Bühler's Ballhaus on September 13, 1913, in the rear building at Auguststrasse 24/25. [3] The house was built around 1895 [4] with two halls [5] : the dance hall on the ground floor and the hall of mirrors on the upper floor. [6] After Fritz Bühler's death, Clara initially continued to run the dance hall, popularly known as Clärchens Ballhaus after its owner, on her own. In 1932 she married Arthur Habermann (1885-1967), who supported her in her work. [7] The front building was in World War IIdestroyed, [8] but operations resumed after the end of the war. Clärchens Ballhaus always remained a private company during the GDR era. [9] In 1965, after much pressure, the ruins of the former front building were removed, the area is still undeveloped today. From 1967 to 1989 the management of the ballroom went to Clärchen's stepdaughter Elfriede Wolff (daughter of Arthur Habermann). Then their son Stefan took over the business. After German reunification, Clara Habermann's biological daughter was granted the property, whose son in turn sold the building in 2003 as the next heir. The new owner, Hans-Joachim Sander, left the family business, which then ceased operations after 91 years. [10]

After the previous operators left the Ballhaus on New Year's Eve 2004, Christian Schulz and David Regehr took over the location and left it largely unchanged. Since then, the space in front of the Ballhaus has also been managed, where the front building stood before the Second World War. [11] The hall of mirrors on the upper floor, which was only used as a storage room for years, has since been used as an event room. [12]

In the summer of 2018 the house was bought by Yoram Roth. He chose the Berlin catering company Berlin Cuisine Jensen GmbH as a partner for the construction of a new restaurant and as the operator of the location, with which Clärchens Ballhaus reopened in July 2020.

Importance

Clärchen's ball house is one of the last remaining ball houses from around 1900  in Berlin.  During the GDR era, it was known to both East and West Germans as a meeting place.  In the media it was repeatedly represented in reports, for example in the film by Wilma Pradetto  about the cloakroom operator Günter Schmidtke,  in the documentary Edith bei Clärchen ( Andreas Kleinert 1985) or on ZDF .  It also served as a filming location for movies Stauffenberg (2004), Inglourious Basterds(2009)  and We Do It For Money (2014). In 2019 Max Raabe's MTV Unplugged concert was recorded in the Ballhaus . 

In addition to evening events, dance courses also take place in the Ballhaus.

References 

1890s architecture
Ballrooms
Restaurants in Germany
Heritage sites in Berlin